Mahbubur Rahman FCPS is a retired Major General of Bangladesh Army and the former Director General of the Directorate General of Medical Services. Prior to this appointment, he was Consultant Surgeon General of DGMS.

Career 
General Mahbubur Rahman completed his FCPS(Surgery) from BCPS. He pursued a colorectal surgery fellowship from France. Rahman assumes the Director General post in the year of 2020 after retirement of Major General Fashiur Rahman. General Mahbub retires from DGMS on 22 February 2022.

References 

Bangladeshi military doctors
Bangladesh Army generals
Year of birth missing (living people)
Living people